Hamilton East is a former provincial electoral district in Ontario, Canada. It was represented in the Legislative Assembly of Ontario from 1894 to 2007, when it was redistributed between the new ridings of Hamilton Centre and Hamilton East—Stoney Creek. It was originally created from the old riding of Hamilton, split in 1894 to create Hamilton East and Hamilton West.

It was considered a working class district.

History
This riding elected the first Co-operative Commonwealth Federation Member of the Legislative Assembly (MLA) to the Ontario legislature: Samuel Lawrence in the 1934 provincial election. The riding had previously elected Ontario's first ever provincial Labour MLA Allan Studholme in a 1906 by-election. Studholme remained in office until his death in 1919 when he was succeeded in by another Labour MLA, George Grant Halcrow (1919–1923).

It was last represented provincially by Andrea Horwath of the Ontario New Democratic Party. In the 2007 election, Horwath was reelected in the successor riding of Hamilton Centre.

Members of Provincial Parliament

Election results

External links
 Elections Ontario  1999 results and 2003 results
Elections Ontario information for Hamilton East (provincial)

Former provincial electoral districts of Ontario